Gruszka is a Polish-language surname. It means "pear" in Polish and is most common in southern Poland.

People 
 Franciszek Gruszka (1910-1940), Polish fighter pilot
 Józef Gruszka (born 1947), Polish politician
 Karolina Gruszka (born 1980), Polish film actress
 Piotr Gruszka (born 1977), Polish volleyball player

References

See also
 

Polish-language surnames